William Stuart Wilson, Jr. was a professional American football player for the Staten Island Stapletons in the National Football League. He attended Washington & Jefferson College.

Notes
 

1905 births
1963 deaths
American football fullbacks
American football halfbacks
Staten Island Stapletons players
Washington & Jefferson College alumni
Washington & Jefferson Presidents football players